Ghalibaf may refer to:
 Mohammad-Bagher Ghalibaf, Iranian politician
 Qalibaf (disambiguation), places in Iran